Urban Search and Rescue California Task Force 5 or CA-TF5 is a FEMA Urban Search and Rescue Task Force based in Orange County, California.  CA-TF5 is sponsored by the Orange County Fire Authority.

CA-TF5 is one of six Task Forces that is Weapons of Mass Destruction (WMD) certified having received extensive training in responding to incidents involving chemical, biological or radiological agents.

Participating agencies in the Task Force are the Orange County Fire Authority, Orange Fire Department, Anaheim Fire Department (California).

Deployments
 Northridge earthquake, Los Angeles County, California
 Oklahoma City bombing, Oklahoma City, Oklahoma
 Northern California Flood of New Year's Day 1997  - Napa, California; Yuba County, California
 Debris recovery of Space Shuttle Columbia disaster - February 2003.
 Hurricane Katrina
 Hurricane Rita
 Hurricane Gustav
 Hurricane Harvey
 Hurricane Florence
 Surfside Condominium Building Collapse

References

External links
 

California 5
Emergency services in Orange County, California